Lely Morel (November 25, 1909 – December 29, 2013) was an Argentine vedette, singer and film actress of the Golden Age of Argentina cinema who was born in Buenos Aires. She also performed in Brazilian films.

Filmography
Así es el tango (1937)
Adiós Buenos Aires (1938)

External links

Lely Morel @ Cinenacional

1909 births                      
Argentine vedettes
20th-century Argentine women singers
Argentine film actresses
Year of death missing
Singers from Buenos Aires
2013 deaths